Andrew Atwood (born 11 March 1966) is a Welsh international lawn bowler.

Bowls career
He competed for Wales at the 2006 Commonwealth Games in the triples.

In 2007 he won the triples gold medal and fours bronze medal at the Atlantic Bowls Championships

He is a Welsh champion winning the 1996 pairs at the Welsh National Bowls Championships.

References

External links
 
 

1966 births
Living people
Welsh male bowls players
Bowls players at the 2006 Commonwealth Games